Accessibility without Exclusion (Partido Accesibilidad sin Exclusión, "PASE") is a political party in Costa Rica with a special focus on fighting for the rights of people with disabilities. PASE generally takes socially conservative stances, opposing LGBT rights, in vitro fertilization, and the separation of church and state.

In the 2006 general elections, the party won 1.59% of the legislative vote, gaining one seat in the legislature. In 2010, the party surged to 9.17% of the vote, winning four seats in the legislature and entering into coalition with the governing National Liberation Party. In 2014, the party's vote fell to 3.95%, and it lost all but one of its seats. In the next election, party's support dropped even further gaining only 0.38% and losing its only seat.

Deputies
Óscar Andrés López Arias

Electoral performance

Presidential

Parliamentary

References

External links
Official website (in Spanish)

2010 establishments in Costa Rica
Conservative parties in Costa Rica
Disability organizations based in Costa Rica
Disability rights organizations
Political parties established in 2010
Political parties in Costa Rica
Social conservative parties
Single-issue political parties